Brittany Brown is an American female professional wrestler, former promoter and current trainer. She competed in the Ladies Professional Wrestling Association, The Fabulous Moolah's Ladies International Wrestling Association, as well as in Killer Kowalski's International Wrestling Federation, National Wrestling Alliance, World Championship Wrestling, New England Wrestling Federation, World Wide Wrestling Alliance, North American Wrestling Alliance, Empire Pro Wrestling, World Wrestling Alliance (Massachusetts), New England Pro Wrestling and many other Federations during the mid to late 1980s, 1990s, 2000s and 2010s.

She had great feuds most notably with Shelley Francis, ‘Black Venus’ Jean Kirkland, Wendi Richter, Brandi Wine, Leilani Kai, Rustee the Foxx Thomas, Rosebud, Jamie West, Brandi Alexander, Babyface Nellie, Ivory, and Heidi Lee Morgan.

Brown was very closely linked to Queen frontman Freddie Mercury from her mid-teens for many years until his death in 1991 and was also partnered with Aerosmith singer Steven Tyler from 1993-1997 and performed in multiple music videos also beginning in her mid-teens starting with Queen when Freddie Mercury personally chose her at age 16, and then went on to perform in many Queen music videos and many others with multiple other top bands including Aerosmith, Bad Company, The Eagles, Guns ‘n Roses and several more spanning almost four decades.

Professional wrestling career
In 1984, Brown began her training to become a professional wrestler at The Fabulous Moolah's Girl Pro Wrestling School in Columbia, South Carolina under the direct training of The Fabulous Moolah and Donna Christanello. She then trained under Killer Kowalski and was the Ladies Champion of Kowalski's International Wrestling Federation for well over a decade. Brown eventually became one of Kowalski's trainers to both male and female students at his school outside of Boston, Massachusetts. During the same time, she was the IWF Ladies Champion, she was also the Ladies Champion of the National Wrestling Alliance and several independent promotions including Empire Pro Wrestling, National Wrestling Federation, World Wrestling Alliance, and the New England Wrestling Federation. She was known as The Boston Bad Girl due to her 'in-ring' villainous tactics.

Brown worked for multiple Federations including WCW, ICW, NWA, LPWA, IWF, WWWA, NEWF, NAWA, USWF, WWA, EWF, and many, many more.

In 1994, Brown was honored by the Cauliflower Alley Club along with other female inductees Candi Devine, Sherri Martel, Kitty Adams, and Susan Green as well as male inductees Gorilla Monsoon And Pedro Morales. She was also the first female to ever be elected as an officer of the once very prestigious Cauliflower Alley Club under then-President Lou Thesz. Brown was also not only on the Board of The LIWA run by The Fabulous Moolah and Mae Young, but was honored by the organization before becoming an Officer.  In 2013 Ms. Brown was inducted into the New England Professional Wrestling Hall of Fame. Ms. Brown was honored with the ISPW Lifetime Achievement Award in 2022.

On February 27, 1998, Brown beat number-one contender Brandi Alexander and retained her NWA New Jersey Championship title at the Third Annual Eddie Gilbert Memorial Brawl at the Airport Radisson Hotel in Philadelphia, Pennsylvania. The Fabulous Moolah was in Brown's corner while Fred The Elephant Boy from The Howard Stern Show was at ringside with Ms. Alexander.

She and a former partner began a New England-based independent wrestling promotion called the World Wrestling Alliance in 1999 which was around for many years and featured many wrestlers from the WWF Dojo and several Tough Enough stars.

At a Killer Kowalski Birthday Wrestling show, lady wrestler Violet Flame and her husband Steve King, along with an unknown Referee changed the finish so that Flame could win a match. Former ICW wrestler ‘The Boston Bad Boy’ Rocky Raymond was in attendance and along with Wrestler Chris Duffy were ready to pummel King (who is quite small for a wrestler)but Brown got in between them knowing he had no chance against either one but especially not both, so that they could get to their vehicle and get out of there alive. Brown was laughing the entire time, but sad that someone would do something so devious and low, especially at a Kowalski show.

Brown is one of three female professional Wrestlers that broke her neck and resumed her career for many years after healing.

Championships and accomplishments

Cauliflower Alley Club
Other honoree (1994)
International Wrestling Federation
IWF Ladies Championship (4 times)
New England Pro Wrestling Hall of Fame
Class of 2013
New England Pro Wrestling
NEPW Women's Championship (1 time)
New England Wrestling Federation Women's Champion (2 times)
Empire Pro Wrestling Women's Champion (3 Times)
NWA NJ Ladies Champion 
World Wrestling Alliance Women's Champion (4 times)
NAWA - Ladies Champion 
New England Pro Wrestling Hall of Fame Woman's Honoree/inductee - 2013
World Wide Wrestling Alliance
WWWA Woman's Championship (1 time)
2022 Recipient of ISPW Lifetime Achievement Award

References

External links
, Out of the Country interview with Brittany Brown shown in two languages
Hall of Fame - http://www.women-wrestling.org/hall_of_fame/brittany-brown.html
http://www.allaxxessentertainment.com/single-post/2016/04/07/Brittany-Brown  New England Professional Wrestling Hall of Fame Inductee.   
My Breakfast with Bockwinkel http://www.ddtdigest.com/features/gilbert/   
https://www.cagematch.net/?id=2&nr=8991   
http://www.women-wrestling.org/hall_of_fame/brittany-brown.html   
http://www.wrestlingdata.com/index.php?befehl=bios&wrestler=14079
https://steamcommunity.com/sharedfiles/filedetails/?id=1650292342
 https://steamcommunity.com/sharedfiles/filedetails/?id=1650292342
 https://www.cagematch.net/?id=2&nr=8991
 http://www.women-wrestling.org/hall_of_fame/brittany-brown.html
 https://www.nefemalewrestling.com/roster/brittany_brown.html

Living people
American female professional wrestlers
Sportspeople from Plymouth County, Massachusetts
Year of birth missing (living people)
People from Scituate, Massachusetts
Professional wrestling trainers
21st-century American women